Sermiers is a commune in the Marne department in north-eastern France.

See also
Communes of the Marne department
Montagne de Reims Regional Natural Park

References

Communes of Marne (department)